Meir (Ish Shalom) Friedmann (10 July 1831 in Kraszna, district of Kashau (Košice Region), Kingdom of Hungary, Austrian Empire – 1908 in Vienna, Austria-Hungary) was an Austrian-Hungarian Jewish scholar. His editions of the Midrash are the standard texts. His chief editions were the Sifre (1864), the Mekhilta (1870), Pesiqta Rabbathi (1880). At the time of his death he was editing the Sifra. Friedmann, while inspired with regard for tradition, dealt with the Rabbinic texts with modern scientific methods, and rendered conspicuous service to the critical investigation of the Midrash and to the history of early homilies.

Biography 
In 1844, at the age of 13, he entered the yeshiva at Ungvar, Carpathian Ruthenia region (now part of Ukraine) where he was attracted to Chasidism and Kabbalah. At the age of sixteen, he was led by the "Bi'ur" of Moses Mendelssohn to the study of the Bible, and became deeply interested in Hebrew poetry, especially in Wessely's "Shire Tife'ret". At twenty, while living at Miskolc, where he earned his livelihood by giving Talmud instruction, he took up secular studies. In 1858 he entered the University of Vienna. In 1864, when the Vienna bet ha-midrash was founded, he was chosen as teacher of the Bible and Midrash. Later he was hired as a professor in the Israelitisch-Theologische Lehranstalt. Among his students there was Solomon Schechter.

Works 
Friedmann has devoted himself chiefly to the editing of old Midrashim, to which he has added critical notes and valuable introductions. These notes, written in classical rabbinical style, are models of precision and are of great value.

 Friedmann has published the following works in Hebrew:

 The Sifre, Vienna, 1864
 The Mekilta, ib. 1870
 Eshet Chayil, a commentary on Proverbs, ib. 1878
 The Pesikta Rabbati, ib. 1880
 Ha-Tziyyon, a rational interpretation of Ezekiel, ib. 1882
 Dabar 'al Odot ha-Talmud, on the question whether the Talmud can be accurately translated, ib. 1885
 Masseket Makkot, a critical edition of the Talmudical treatise Makkot, with a commentary, ib. 1888
 Sefer Shofetim, notes to Judges, ib. 1891
 Me'ir 'Ayin, a commentary on the Passover Haggadah, ib. 1895
 Tanna debe Eliyahu, ib. 1900

Friedmann's German publications are:
 Worte der Erinnerung an Isaac Noa Mannheimer, ib. 1873
 Die Juden ein Ackerbautreibender Stamm, ib. 1878
 T. G. Stern, Gedenkrede, ib. 1883
 Zerubabel, German explanation of Isaiah, ib. 1890
 "Worte zur Feier des 100 Jahrigen Geburtstages des Seligen Predigers Isaac Noa Mannheimer", 1893
 "Onkelos und 'Akylos," ib. 1896

From 1881 to 1886 Friedmann published, together with Isaac Hirsh Weiss, the monthly Bet Talmud, devoted to rabbinical studies. To this periodical Friedmann contributed, under the signature "Ish Shalom", many valuable essays, of which the most noteworthy are on the arrangement of the Pentateuch and on Samuel.

Bibliography

Jewish Encyclopedia Bibliography 
 Brainin, in Luach Ahiasaf, pp. 343 et seq., 1901
 Ha-Shiloach, p. 573, 1901
 Solomon Schechter, in Jew. Chron. p. 17, June 28, 1901

Additional bibliography 
 An MA on his works by Rabbi Binyamin Zeev Benedict

References 
 Goldman, Yosef. Hebrew Printing in America, 1735-1926, A History and Annotated Bibliography (YGBooks 2006). .

External links
 

1831 births
1908 deaths
People from Rožňava District
People from the Kingdom of Hungary
Slovak Jews
Austro-Hungarian Jews
19th-century Jews
19th-century Hungarian people
Hungarian theologians
19th-century Jewish biblical scholars
Talmudists
20th-century Jewish theologians
19th-century Jewish theologians